Farmington High School is a public high school located in Farmington, Michigan. The school was established in 1888, and the first sections of the current building were built in 1953, with several renovations and additions occurring since then. As of the 2014-2015 school year, the school educates a student body of 1,140. The current Principal is Chris Meussner.

History
Farmington High School traces its roots back over 125 years. While no date has been fully confirmed, 1888 has been accepted as the year the school was first established. The school is listed as being first accredited in 1920 by the University of Michigan. First known as the Union School, the class sizes have grown steadily over the years, from the single digits during the 19th century, to over one thousand students in recent years. The first bus operated by the schools in the area began running with service to Farmington in 1929.

The building itself has changed significantly over the years. One of the earlier buildings, initially constructed in 1918, was used until 1952. In 1953, sections of the current building were first constructed. Additions over the years, including a major renovation in 1998, have increased available space and amenities.

The school mascot is the Falcon, and students commonly referring to the mascot as "Freddie the Falcon."

The hockey team won the state championship in the 2013 / 2014 Season.

Academics

In the 2012-2013 graduating class, 96% of graduates enrolled in a college or university: 69% enrolled in four-year universities, and 27% enrolled in two-year colleges. The remaining 4% of graduates joined the workforce, military, or had other post graduation plans. In the 2013 graduating class, two students were National Merit recipients and four were commended. Out of 357 Advanced Placement exams taken, 305 (85%) received a score of 3 or better.

Farmington does not assign class rank. If college applications require class rank information, for scholarships or otherwise, Farmington will include a letter stating that the school does not rank students, as well as the rationale behind the decision not to perform ranking.

Enrollment and graduation history

Test scores
The State of Michigan publishes the ACT test scores for all of the schools in the state. The scores for Farmington are as follows:

Notable alumni

 Rex Cawley, Olympic Gold Medalist, 1964
 Cam Fowler, 2010 First round draft pick, Anaheim Ducks 
 Garlin Gilchrist, Lieutenant Governor of Michigan, 2019–present 
 Robert Patrick, '77, actor
 Peter Rheinstein, 1961, pharmacologist and former FDA official

References

External links
School website
Farmington Public Schools website

Public high schools in Michigan
High schools in Oakland County, Michigan
Buildings and structures in Farmington, Michigan
Educational institutions established in 1888
1888 establishments in Michigan